Manfred Tripbacher (born 23 February 1957) is a retired German footballer.

Career

Tripbacher started his senior career at his hometown club FC Augsburg in the 2. Bundesliga. After three seasons, he transferred to Bundesliga side Eintracht Braunschweig together with his manager at Augsburg, Werner Olk. He went on to spend six seasons in the Bundesliga, as well as two seasons in the 2. Bundesliga, with Braunschweig. In 1986 Tripbacher returned to Augsburg to play at the semi-pro and amateur level. During the late 1980s he joined BC Harlekin Augsburg, a club founded by an amusement arcade entrepreneur with the goal to take the team with former professional players like Tripbacher and Marinho Chagas from the lowest division to the Bundesliga. However, the plan was quickly given up, and Tripbacher continued as player and manager in the lower divisions of Bavarian football.

References

External links

1957 births
Living people
Sportspeople from Augsburg
Footballers from Bavaria
German footballers
German football managers
Eintracht Braunschweig players
FC Augsburg players
Association football midfielders
Bundesliga players
2. Bundesliga players
TSV Schwaben Augsburg players